Ron McMahon (29 March 1927 – 10 May 2016) was an Australian rules footballer who played with Melbourne in the Victorian Football League (VFL).

Notes

External links 		

		
		
		
1927 births
2016 deaths
Australian rules footballers from Victoria (Australia)		
Melbourne Football Club players
Maryborough Football Club players